Maryse Bastié (27 February 1898 – 6 July 1952) was a French aviator who set several international records for female aviators during the 1930s.

Early life 
She was born Marie-Louise Bombec in Limoges, Haute-Vienne; Bastié's father died when she was eleven, and her family struggled to survive. As an adolescent she worked in a shoe factory, money was scarce and an early marriage that failed left her with a child, who died young, and limited means.

Flying career 
As a result of her marriage to Louis Bastié, a World War I pilot, she became fascinated by the new phenomenon of powered flight and was determined to become a pilot and to own her own plane. She obtained her license to fly and although her husband was killed in a plane crash (in 1926), Maryse Bastié began doing aerobatics to earn money to keep herself flying and in 1927 purchased her own aircraft, a Caudron C.109.

Records set by Maryse Bastié in the 1930s included international records for women in duration flying, distance, and a record time for a solo flight across the South Atlantic. Her performances earned her the Harmon Trophy in 1931. In 1935 she founded her own flying school at Orly Airport.

Bastié served in the French Air Force, rising to the rank of Captain while logging more than 3,000 hours' flying time. In 1937, she published her story under the title Ailes ouvertes: carnet d'une aviatrice.

Awards 

On 1931, Bastié was awarded a Knight in France's Legion of Honour for her flight on 28 June 1931, a 2976 km journey from Le Bourget to Yurino (Russia) undertaken in 30 hours 30 minutes at an average speed of 97 km/h. On 1936, this was upgraded to the rank of officer for Bastié's flight aboard her Caudron 635 Simoun F-Anxo (30 December 1936), which broke the record for crossing the South Atlantic in 12 hours 5 minutes. On 1947, her rank was upgraded to that of commander, for her "exceptional war titles and acts of resistance".

Death and burial 
On 6 July 1952, following a conference in Lyon, Maryse Bastié was killed when her plane crashed during takeoff. She is buried in the Cimetière du Montparnasse in Paris.

Posthumous honors
The "Lycée professionnel régional Maryse Bastié" in Hayange-Marspich, the 
"Lycée Maryse Bastié" in Limoges, and the "College Maryse Bastié" in Reims as well as in Vélizy-Villacoublay and Ingrandes-Le Fresne sur Loire are named in her memory. The Real Estate Services division of aircraft maker Bombardier Inc. named a street in her honor in Saint-Laurent, Quebec as did the French cities of Anglet, Bron, Haguenau, Châteaulin and Lyon.

In 1955, the Government of France honored Maryse Bastié with her image on an airmail postage stamp.

There is a memorial to Maryse Bastile in the west of Paris in a small park of the Boulevard du Garigliano M. Valin not far from the Seine.

A plaque commemorates her on the wall of her former home at 23 rue Froidevaux, Paris 14e.

See also

 Legion of Honour
 Legion of Honour Museum 
 List of Legion of Honour recipients by name (B)
 Ribbons of the French military and civil awards

References

Further reading
 History Today article by Sian Reynolds, University of Sussex 
 Ailes ouvertes : carnet d'une aviatrice. Maryse Bastié (1937) Fasquelle ASIN B0000DTBTE
 La Vie de Maryse Bastié. Marcel Migeo (1948) Editions du Seuil 
 Une Française, Maryse Bastié. Vice-Amiral Amanrich. (1953) Editions Baudiniere ASIN B0000DUSXE
 Une trace dans le ciel. Agnès Clancier (2017) Editions Arléa 

1898 births
1952 deaths
People from Limoges
Harmon Trophy winners
Aviators killed in aviation accidents or incidents in France
Women in World War II
Commandeurs of the Légion d'honneur
Burials at Montparnasse Cemetery
Recipients of Étoile Civique
Recipients of the Aeronautical Medal
French women aviators
French aviation record holders
Victims of aviation accidents or incidents in 1952
French women aviation record holders
20th-century French women